Bank Julius Baer & Co. v. WikiLeaks, 535 F. Supp. 2d 980 (N.D. Cal. 2008), was a lawsuit filed by Bank Julius Baer against the website WikiLeaks.

In early February 2008, Judge Jeffrey White of the U.S. District Court for the Northern District of California forced Dynadot, the domain registrar of wikileaks.org, to disassociate the site's domain name records with its servers, preventing use of the domain name to reach the site. Initially, the bank only wanted the documents to be removed (WikiLeaks had failed to name a contact person).

The judge's actions roused media and cyber-liberties groups to defend WikiLeaks' rights under the First Amendment and brought renewed scrutiny to the documents the bank hoped to shield.

The judge lifted the injunction and the bank dropped the case on 5 March 2008.

Background
In 2002, the bank learned that records pertaining to the arrangement of anonymizing trusts in the Cayman Islands for clients from 1997 to 2002 had been leaked. They interviewed the local employees with a polygraph as per company policy. The bank was unsatisfied with the answers of Cayman unit COO Rudolf Elmer, and terminated his employment. In June 2005, the leak was reported by the Swiss financial weekly Cash and The Wall Street Journal, though details of individual accounts were not reported on. In December 2007, Elmer released documents to WikiLeaks regarding surveillance of him and his family. The next month, some of the leaked account data began appearing on WikiLeaks. Contributors to WikiLeaks allege that these provide evidence of asset hiding, money laundering and tax evasion. Ten account holders in the United States, Spain, Peru, Germany, Greece, Hong Kong, and Switzerland have been identified so far on WikiLeaks.

According to Daniel Schmitt's analysis for WikiLeaks, leaked account data exists from after the date that Elmer left the Caymans.

On 16 January 2011, Elmer announced he would hand over offshore account details of 2,000 "high-net-worth individuals" to WikiLeaks. Then he would return to Switzerland from exile to face trial. Julius Baer says Elmer falsified the documents.

The law firm representing Baer was Lavely and Singer. The law firm representing Baer works primarily in the entertainment industry in Los Angeles. They applied for and got the injunction at a court in San Francisco - 450 miles (700 km) from Los Angeles. They claimed to be acting, in part, to protect Baer's customers from having information about the customers become public. But one of the documents filed in court by Lavely and Singer identified one of the customers of interest by name as well as giving his street address.

Legal action, injunction

In January, Bank Julius Baer began sending cease & desist letters to WikiLeaks and its domain registrar, Dynadot, for the wikileaks.org domain name, citing the DMCA. On 18 February 2008, Judge Jeffrey White of the U.S. District Court for the Northern District of California issued a permanent injunction against Dynadot forcing it to "lock the wikileaks.org domain name".  Mirror sites were not affected. The text of the posted injunction stated that "immediate harm will result to Plaintiffs in the absence of injunctive relief", as is required for injunctions to be granted. The general assumption is that some leaked documents were alleged by the bank to be libellous, trade secrets, copyrighted, or otherwise prohibited for distribution, in a manner that would cause harm to it.

WikiLeaks had not sent a representative to the hearing at which the injunction was granted. According to an editorial on the WikiLeaks website, Julius Baer had some communication with WikiLeaks before going to court to get the injunction, but did not inform WikiLeaks in which city it would seek the injunction and did not present to the court these email communications.

A coincidental fire at the hosting company used by WikiLeaks, PRQ, centered in a high power supply regulator serving the majority of the data center, shut down and destroyed some sections of the specific DNS and dedicated hosting server racks used by WikiLeaks the same week.

Reaction
The Julius Baer lawsuit drew a great deal more negative attention than would the leaks alone, due to the Streisand effect.  Julius Baer had already got an injunction against WikiLeaks, prohibiting WikiLeaks from circulating the documents that Julius Baer wanted to suppress, without attracting significant attention from news media. But then Julius Baer drew attention to itself by seeking and getting a second injunction imposing a measure that would suppress not only the information that Julius Baer considered embarrassing, but also the entire WikiLeaks website. The WikiLeaks website claims to have 1.2 million documents that users have posted anonymously that deserve public scrutiny. Only 14 of these documents were pertinent to the Julius Baer case.

As well as backfiring in terms of the attention it attracted, the injunction could not be entirely effective in suppressing the website anyway in that the alternate WikiLeaks domains were unaffected, and WikiLeaks was still available directly by its IP address. To shut down these access methods, it would be necessary to pursue injunctions in the jurisdictions where they are registered, or where the servers reside, which are deliberately scattered to make this difficult.

Injunction lifted
After the injunction was initially granted, it was successfully challenged in a joint action by the Electronic Frontier Foundation (EFF), American Civil Liberties Union (ACLU), Project on Government Oversight (POGO), and Jordan McCorkle. A similar brief was filed by Public Citizen and California First Amendment Coalition (CFAC). 

Another brief in support of WikiLeaks was filed by the Reporters Committee for Freedom of the Press (RCFP), American Society of Newspaper Editors (ASNE), Associated Press (AP), Citizen Media Law Project, E.W. Scripps Company, Gannett Company, Inc., Hearst Corporation, Los Angeles Times, National Newspaper Association (NNA), Radio-Television News Directors Association (RTNDA), and Society of Professional Journalists (SPJ) which also provided some legal funding.

Judge White dissolved the injunction on 29 February 2008, allowing WikiLeaks to reclaim its domain name.

The bank dropped the case on 5 March 2008.

References

External links
 
 Court docket for Bank Julius Baer & Co. v. WikiLeaks, No. 3:08-cv-00824 is available from CourtListener Internet Archive
 Bank Julius Baer & Co v. Wikileaks website from the Electronic Frontier Foundation (EFF)

2008 in California
2008 in United States case law
Internet censorship in the United States
Legal cases involving WikiLeaks
United States District Court for the Northern District of California cases